Button fern is a common name for several plants and may refer to:

Pellaea rotundifolia, a popular house plant native to New Zealand
Tectaria cicutaria, native to the Caribbean

See also
Nephrolepis cordifolia - Lemon Button fern

References